Norwegian music production duo Seeb have released one studio album, three extended plays, thirty singles, and a number of remixes.

Studio albums

Extended plays

Singles

Notes

Remixes

References

Discographies of Norwegian artists